Aruna Darshana (or Dharshana; born 19 January 1999) is a Sri Lankan sprinter specialising in the 400 metres. He was born in a rural village call Seruwila near Trincomalee.

Career

2018 season
South Asian Junior Athletics Championships
On home soil, Darshana won the 200, 400 m and contributed to the 4 × 400 m relay at the 2018 South Asian Junior Athletics Championships in Colombo.

Asian Junior Athletics Championships
Darshana won two gold medals at the 2018 Asian Junior Athletics Championships in Gifu, Japan. In the 400 m event, Darshana broke the Championship record by running the race in 45.79 seconds. Later, he anchored the 4 × 400 m relay team to gold.

World Junior Athletics Championships
Darshana advanced to the semifinals in the 400 m event at the 2018 World Junior Athletics Championships in Tampere, Finland. In the semifinals, Darshana finished fifth in his heat, failing to advance to the final. Darshana later led the 4 × 400 m relay team to an eighth-place finish.

Asian Games
Darshana was selected for the 2018 Asian Games in Jakarta, Indonesia. Darshana is scheduled to compete in the 400 m and 4 × 400 m relay events.

References

1999 births
Living people
Sri Lankan male sprinters
People from Trincomalee District
Athletes (track and field) at the 2018 Asian Games
Asian Games competitors for Sri Lanka
South Asian Games medalists in athletics
20th-century Sri Lankan people
21st-century Sri Lankan people